Atletico Brilhantes Da Kissama is an Angolan football club based in Viana.

Current squad

Football clubs in Angola